Liqeni i Dhenve (meaning Lake of the Sheep in Albanian) is a small mountain lake in the north of Albania. Dhenve lake is situated in the Prokletije range near to the border with Kosovo. Dhenve Lake is a round lake, and the river that originates from it flows down into the Gashi River.

Notes and references
Notes:

References:

Lakes of Albania
Accursed Mountains